Drala may refer to:

 Drala, the Fijian name for Erythrina variegata
 Drala, a class of minor deity in Tibetan folk religion
 Drala, music composed to accompany hatha yoga